Grau Province is one of the seven provinces of the Apurímac Region in Peru. The capital of the province is the city of Chuquibambilla.

The province was named after the naval officer Miguel Grau Seminario.

Boundaries
North: Abancay Province
East: Cotabambas Province
South: Antabamba Province
West: Abancay Province

Geography 
Other mountains are listed below:

Political division
The province measures  and is divided into fourteen districts:
 Chuquibambilla
 Curasco
 Curpahuasi
 Huayllati
 Mamara
 Mariscal Gamarra
 Micaela Bastidas
 Pataypampa
 Progreso
 San Antonio
 Santa Rosa
 Turpay
 Vilcabamba
 Virundo

Ethnic groups 
The people in the province are mainly indigenous citizens of Quechua descent. Quechua is the language which the majority of the population (81.28%) learnt to speak in childhood, 18.17% of the residents started speaking using the Spanish language and  0.22% using Aymara (2007 Peru Census).

See also 
 Ccotancaire
 Ccullco
 Chinaqucha
 Intikancha
 Kimsaqucha
 Q'urawiri
 Tipiqucha
 Urququcha

Sources 

Provinces of the Apurímac Region